The California naloxone requirement bill is legislation passed by the California legislature and signed into law in 2018. The bill, numbered AB 2760, and sponsored by state Assembly member Jim Wood, requires medical prescribers to offer a prescription for naloxone (or equivalent) to certain populations at higher risk of overdosing from opiate drugs.

Background 
The United States formally began an opiate abuse and addiction epidemic in the 1990s. The epidemic traces its narrative to the over-prescribing of opioid pain medication by physicians. Between 1999 and 2017, more than 399,000 people died from drug overdoses that involved either prescription or illicit opiate drugs.

Naloxone is a prescription medication that reverses an opioid overdose, often in seconds. An opioid overdose stops breathing, which is why they are often fatal. The administration of naloxone via nasal spray or direct injection can quickly restart breathing in an overdose victim.

In 2018, 67,367 people died from drug overdose deaths. According to DrugAbuse.gov, “Opioids were involved in 46,802 (a rate of 14.6) overdose deaths in 2018—nearly 70% of all overdose deaths.” In California that year, an estimated 45% of all drug overdose deaths involved opioids, amounting to approximately 2,400 fatalities (a rate of 5.8/1,000).

Legislation 
The bill requires prescribers to offer a prescription for the opioid-reversal agent naloxone, or any other drug approved by the FDA for the reversal of opioid depression, when any of the following are true:

 A patient is prescribed 90 or more morphine milligram equivalents per day,
 A patient is prescribed both an opioid and a benzodiazepine drug at the same time, or
 A patient is prescribed an opioid drug and presents with an increased risk of overdose due to a number of conditions (for example, having a history of substance use disorder).

The law also requires prescribers to provide patient education on the use of naloxone.

Prescribers who fail to follow the law are to be referred to the appropriate licensing board for disciplinary action.

Legislative action 
The bill, California Assembly Bill 2760, was introduced on February 16, 2018, in the California legislature by Assembly member Jim Wood (D-CA). It passed both chambers of the legislature, Senate and Assembly, unanimously. On September 10, 2018, California Governor Jerry Brown signed the bill into law.

See also 

 Colorado Harm Reduction Substance Use Disorders Law
 Illinois Opioids-Covid-19-Naloxone Resolution
 New Jersey Opioid Antidote Prescription Bill
 New York Mandatory Opioid Antagonist Prescription Bill
 South Carolina Opioid Overdose Prevention Bill

References

United States state health legislation